RTV Noord is a regional radio and television public broadcaster in Groningen, Netherlands. , its radio programs are broadcast on FM 97.5 MHz. It broadcasts TV and radio programming 24 hours per day, seven days a week.  Some content is broadcast in the Gronings dialect of Dutch.
A popular part of the broadcaster's website is "Groningen in Beeld" ("Groningen in pictures"), which features pictures of Groningen Province uploaded by listeners.

See also
 Netherlands Public Broadcasting

References

External links
 
 Groningen in Beeld

Mass media in Groningen (province)
Radio stations in the Netherlands
Television in the Netherlands